Hopleacanthus is a Permian genus of shark from the Kupferschiefer of Germany.

References

Elasmobranchii
Kupferschiefer